The Lamar County School District is a public school district in Lamar County, Georgia, United States, based in Barnesville. It serves the communities of Aldora, Barnesville, and Milner.

Schools
The Lamar County School District has two elementary schools, one middle school, and one high school.

Elementary schools
 Lamar County Elementary School
 Lamar County Primary School

Middle school
 Lamar County Middle School

High school
 Lamar County High School

References

External links

School districts in Georgia (U.S. state)
Education in Lamar County, Georgia